The women's individual competition at the 2002 Asian Games in Busan was held from 3 October to 6 October at the Asiad Country Club.

Schedule
All times are Korea Standard Time (UTC+09:00)

Results

References 

2002 Asian Games Official Report, Page 424
Results

Golf at the 2002 Asian Games
2002 in women's golf